The Asian Boxing Council (ABCO) is a professional boxing organization that sanctions title fights in the Greater Asian region.

History
At the 1985 World Boxing Council (WBC) annual convention in Bangkok, Thailand, the late Sahasombhop Srisomvongse and representatives from Sri Lanka, Nepal, Pakistan, India, Qatar, Bangladesh, Bhutan, Jordan, Malaysia and Kuwait launched the Asian Boxing Council (ABCO) as a confederation affiliated with WBC. 

After Sahasombhop’s death in 2000, Pol. Gen. Kovid Bhakdibhumi, became President of the WBC Asian Boxing Council.

Purpose
1. To promote the boxing activities throughout Asia.

2. To organize top rated championship bouts for the great Asian fighters.

3. To supervise the safe competition in Asian region.

Members
20 national members.

Key Persons

Current ABCO title holders

ABCO Awards

Other regional WBC federations
North American Boxing Federation (NABF)
Oriental and Pacific Boxing Federation (OPBF)
European Boxing Union (EBU)
Asian Boxing Council (ABCO)
African Boxing Union (ABU)
Caribbean Boxing Federation (CABOFE)
Central American Boxing Federation (FECARBOX)
CIS and Slovenian Boxing Bureau (CISBB)
South American Boxing Federation (FESUBOX)
Hispanic World Boxing Association (ABMH)

External links
 Official site

Professional boxing organizations
Sports organizations established in 1985
1985 establishments in Thailand